Question 7 is a 1961 American-West German film directed by Stuart Rosenberg and starring Michael Gwynn, Margaret Jahnen and Christian de Bresson. It won the National Board of Review Award for Best Film. It was also entered into the 11th Berlin International Film Festival.

Plot
In post-war East Germany, Peter Gottfried is the son of minister Friedrich Gottfried. The Communist regime has decreed that all children of "dissidents" will be denied entry to a prestigious music conservatory. Peter is anxious to be accepted, and in order to get in he prepares to answer the seven questions required by the conservatory, the seventh of which will require him to deny his religious convictions. Before this can happen, he is invited by the Socialist Unity Party to perform at the Berlin Youth Festival. Friedrich protests, knowing that the Communists intend to use his son as a political pawn, to "prove" to the world that East Germany affords equal rights to clergymen. In the end, it is Peter himself who decides to quit the Festival and defect to the West.

Cast
 Michael Gwynn as Friedrich Gottfried
 Margaret Jahnen as Gerda Gottfried
 Christian De Bresson as Peter Gottfried
 Almut Eggert as Anneliese Zingler
 Erik Schumann as Rolf Starke
 Max Buchsbaum as Inspector Hermann
 John Ruddock as Martin Kraus
 Leo Bieber as Herr Rettmann
 Fritz Wepper as Heinz Dehmert
 Eduard Linkers as Otto Zingler
 Marianne Schubarth as Marta Zingler
 Philo Hauser as Barber
 Rolf von Nauckhoff as Karl Marschall
 Helmo Kindermann as Luedtke
 Manfred Fuerst as Professor Steffl

See also
 List of American films of 1961

References

External links
 
 

1961 films
1961 drama films
American black-and-white films
Films directed by Stuart Rosenberg
Cold War films
Films set in East Germany
Films critical of communism
American drama films
UFA GmbH films
Films shot in Berlin
1960s English-language films
1960s American films